Kyle Lukoff is a children's book author, school librarian, and former bookseller. He is most known for the Stonewall award-winning When Aidan Became a Brother and for Call Me Max, which gained attention when parents in Texas complained about the book being read in an elementary school classroom and a Utah school district canceled its book program after the book was read to third graders.

Personal life
Lukoff is a transgender man. He transitioned in 2004 while an undergraduate at Barnard College, a historically women's college. Much of his work centers on transgender children. He is Jewish.

Education 
Lukoff went to Edmonds-Woodway High School then graduated from Barnard College in 2006. While at Barnard, he was a member of Columbia University's Philolexian Society. He earned his Master's degree in library science from Queens College in 2012.

Career
Lukoff was a school librarian at the Corlears School in New York City until he quit his job to write full time in 2020. His first book, A Storytelling of Ravens, was published in 2018 by House of Anansi Press and illustrated by Natalie Nelson. His second book, When Aidan Became a Brother, illustrated by Kaylani Juanita, is a story about a transgender boy awaiting a new sibling. The book was published by Lee & Low, an independent publisher known for works by unpublished authors and illustrators of color.

Lukoff's Max and Friends series was released in November 2019 with Call Me Max, illustrated by Luciano Luzano. In April 2020, he published Explosion at the Poem Factory and was illustrated by Mark Hoffman. In 2021, he published Too Bright to See, which won the Stonewall award and a Newbery honor, and was a finalist for the National Book Award for Young People's Literature.

Publications

Books 
A Storytelling of Ravens, 2018
When Aidan Became a Brother, 2019
Call Me Max, 2019
Max and the Talent Show, 2019
Explosion at the Poem Factory, 2020
Max on the Farm, 2020
Too Bright to See, 2021
Different Kinds of Fruit, 2022
Mermaid Days #1: The Sunken Ship, 2022
If You're a Kid Like Gavin, 2022, with Gavin Grimm
Mermaid Days #2: The Sea Monster, 2022
Awake, Asleep, 2023
Mermaid Days #3: A New Friend, 2023

Essays 
 "Taking up Space" in Gender Outlaws: The Next Generation
 "Evaluating Transgender Picture Books; Calling for Better Ones" in School Library Journal. 
 "Second Trans on the Moon" in YA Pride. 
 "A letter to trans writers who are thinking about trying to get published."

Awards 

 2022 Winner: Stonewall Children's and Young Adult Literature for Too Bright to See
 2022 Honor: Newbery for Too Bright to See
 2021 Finalist: National Book Award, Young People's Literature for Too Bright to See
2020 Winner: Stonewall Children's and Young Adult Literature for When Aidan Became a Brother
 2020 Honor: Charlotte Huck Award for Outstanding Fiction for Children.

References

1984 births
Living people
People from Skokie, Illinois
Writers from Illinois
Barnard College alumni
Queens College, City University of New York alumni
American children's writers
Transgender Jews
Transgender men
American librarians
Stonewall Book Award winners
American transgender writers